AS160 (Akt substrate of 160 kDa), which was originally known as TBC1 domain family member 4 (TBC1D4), is a Rab GTPase-activating protein that in humans is encoded by the TBC1D4 gene.  

The 160 kD protein product was first discovered in a screen for novel substrates of the serine-threonine kinase Akt2, which phosphorylates AS160 at Thr-642 and Ser-588 after insulin stimulation.  Insulin stimulation of fat and muscle cells results in translocation of the glucose transporter GLUT4 to the plasma membrane, and this translocation process is dependent on phosphorylation of AS160.  The role of AS160 in GLUT4 translocation is mediated by its GTPase activating domain and interactions with Rab proteins in vesicle formation, increasing GLUT4 translocation when its GTPase activity is inhibited by Akt phosphorylation. Specifically, this inhibition activates RAB2A, RAB8A, RAB10 and RAB14.  

AS160 also contains a calmodulin-binding domain, and this domain mediates phosphorylation-independent glucose uptake in muscle cells.

References

Further reading